Pioneer High School is a public school in West Whittier-Los Nietos, a census-designated place in unincorporated Los Angeles County, California.

Academics
Pioneer High School encourages the taking of AP courses in order to challenge and prepare for college.

Pioneer High School offers a wide variety of AP courses, which include:
 AP Biology
 AP Calculus AB
 AP Calculus BC
 AP Chemistry
 AP English Language and Composition
 AP English Literature and Composition
 AP Environmental Science
 AP French Language
 AP Human Geography
 AP Physics C
 AP Spanish Language
 AP Spanish Literature
 AP United States Government and Politics
 AP United States History
 AP World History

General information

Pioneer High School, home of the Titans, is located in unincorporated community of West Whittier-Los Nietos, California, neighboring the city of Pico Rivera.  The school serves students from the Los Nietos, South Whittier, and Whittier City school districts. PHS is one of the 5 comprehensive high schools in the Whittier Union High School District.

Demographics
The student body at pioneer is 96.4% Hispanic, 1.8% White, and less than 1% each Asian, Black, Native American and Pacific Islander. (As of 2020-2021)

Titan sports

Fall sports
Cross country
Football 
Tennis (girls)
Volleyball (girls)
Water polo (boys)

Winter sports
Basketball
Soccer - 1979 3A CIF Champs; 1978, 1979 
Wrestling -

Spring sports
Baseball 
Golf
Softball
Swimming
Tennis (boys)
Track & field 
Volleyball (boys)

Summer sports
 Wrestling
 Baseball
 Basketball
 Cross country
 Football
 Soccer
 Tennis
 Volleyball
 Water polo

Notable former pupils 

 Lauren Tewes; actress.

References

External links 
 Pioneer High School
 Titan Tribune, 1959-1960
 Titan Tribune, 1960-1961
 Titan Tribune, 1961-1962
 Titan Tribune, 1962-1963
 Pioneer Highschool School - Titan Memories (1963)
 President Reagan's Question-and-Answer Session With Pioneer High School Students on June 30, 1983
 1983 CNN Report about Pioneer
 Pioneer High School Showcase (2022)

High schools in Los Angeles County, California
Public high schools in California
1959 establishments in California